Dillard McCollum High School is a public high school in San Antonio, Texas, United States in the Harlandale Independent School District. It is classified as a 5A school by the University Interscholastic League (UIL). In 2017, the school was rated "Met Standard" by the Texas Education Agency, and earned a 2-star distinction for Academic Achievements in ELA/Reading and Science.

History
The school was named in honor of Dillard McCollum, who served in the community as a student, teacher, principal, and superintendent for twenty years.

Frontier Bowl
The annual Frontier Bowl is one of the oldest and fiercest high school football rivalry games. It pits the Harlandale High School Indians against the McCollum High School Cowboys at Memorial Stadium. The match-up has a 50-year history.

Accomplishments
In 1972, McCollum was chosen as the Bellamy Award receipent. Only one high school is chosen in the United States each year, with a 50-year rotation for each state. 
In 1992, Clifton Bennett won the state championship in editorial writing.

In 2022, the McCollum Indoor Percussion placed 1st in the TECA State Championship for Indoor Percussion.

In 2022, the McCollum Color Guard placed 1st in the TECA State Championship for Color Guard. 

In 2022, the McCollum Band received Sweepstakes in UIL for both their Concert and Wind Ensemble Band.

McCollum Cowboy Band and Color Guard

The Pride of the Southside! The Award Winning Band from Cowboy Land! The McCollum Cowboy Band has a rich history of excellence, from winning sweepstakes at UIL, to winning State level championships. Apart of the McCollum band is the McCollum Indoor Percussion and Color Guard, both of which placed 1st in the TECA State Championships (2022). The McCollum Band also is known for going viral in a Fiesta video featuring their rendition of "El Baile de la Gorila (2017). The McCollum Band is currently headed by Gilbert Borrego, Briann Jasso, and Johan Escalera.

Clubs
 McCollum Cowboy Band
 Color Guard
 Golds Stars Dance Team
 Cyber Security Club
 National Honor Society
 National Technical Honor Society
 Business Professionals of America
 Anime Club
 Art Club
 Auto Tech
 Spanish Club
 French Club
 ASL Club
 HOSA
 VICA
 Drama Club
 Robotics Club
 Math Club
 Media Club
 J.R.O.T.C
 Gamma Sigma Girls
 TAFE

Athletics
The McCollum Cowboys compete in the following sports:

Baseball
Basketball
Cross country
Football
Golf
Soccer
Softball
Tennis
Track and field
Volleyball
Marching Band

State Title
 Volleyball 
1976(4A)

The Leadership School
The School of Leadership and Public Service (SLPS) is a magnet program on campus at McCollum High School. The Department Chair is currently Yvonne Valdez. The program requires numerous hours of community service and encourages students to take on leadership positions throughout the school.

Notable alumni
 Jonathan Joss (Class of 1983), is an actor and the voice of John Redcorn in the animated series King of the Hill
 Emilio Navaira (Class of 1980), was a Mexican-American musician who performed country and Tejano music
 Yolanda Saldívar (Class of 1979), is the convicted murderer of Latin music superstar Selena, and is currently serving a life sentence in the Texas Department of Criminal Justice.
 Carlos Uresti (Class of 1981), is the current Texas State Senator from Senate District 19. He is also a former Texas State Representative, and a San Antonio attorney.

Principals

References
 McCollum History

External links
 Official website

Educational institutions established in 1962
High schools in San Antonio
Public high schools in Texas
Magnet schools in Texas
1962 establishments in Texas